"What If God Fell from the Sky" is a song by Danielle Brisebois, the first single off her 1994 album Arrive All Over You. The song's title is often confused with lyrics in the chorus to Joan Osborne's "One of Us", but Brisebois's song was released a year earlier. In 2004, it was featured in the soundtrack to the film Saved!.

Track listing
"What If God Fell from the Sky" (Danielle Brisebois, Gregg Alexander) – 2:53
"Ain't Gonna Cry No More" (Brisebois, Alexander) – 4:47
"Sinking Slow" (Brisebois, Andy Sturmer, Roger Manning, Alexander) – 3:42

External links
 Danielle Brisebois lyrics
 NewRadicals.Us. Unofficial forum covering New Radicals, Gregg Alexander and Danielle Brisebois.

Danielle Brisebois songs
1994 singles
Songs written by Gregg Alexander
Songs written by Danielle Brisebois
1994 songs
Song recordings produced by Gregg Alexander
Epic Records singles